Inhaúma Station is a subway station on the Rio de Janeiro Metro that services the neighbourhood of Inhaúma in the North Zone of Rio de Janeiro. It is located near the Inhaúma Cemetery.

References

Metrô Rio stations
Railway stations opened in 1983